Valid name can refer to:

Biology:

Valid name (zoology), equivalent to the correct name in botany and bacteriology. 
A validly published name in botany, not necessarily legitimate or correct.
A validly published name in bacteriology, not necessarily legitimate or correct.

Other:

Name at birth
Legal name
Legal name (business)